Aanandha Kummi is a 1983 Indian Tamil-language film directed by Bala Krishnan and produced by Jeeva Ilaiyaraaja for Ilaiyaraaja Pictures. The film stars Ashwini and a newcomer Balachandran. It was released on 25 December 1983, and failed at the box office.

Plot 

The pannaiyar of a small village is highly respected due to his generosity and kindness. His wife is equally well-liked and the loving couple have a son, Jeeva. The pannaiyar's right-hand man is Azhagiri, a man who's feared throughout the town as he's prone to violence. However, he will only resort to violence when he feels an injustice or wrong warrants his intervention. Azhagiri's sister, Devanai, is a young widow with a daughter, Selvi. The pannaiyar and his wife financially support Devanai's family. Selvi and Jeeva go to school together and are friends from childhood. As they grow older, their friendship grows into love. They go away to attend the same college. While they're away, long brewing secrets between the two families come to light and drastically change both families' circumstances. Jeeva and Selvi return home to a much-altered situation and face new challenges to their love that they must overcome.

Cast 
Balachandran
Ashwini
Goundamani
Senthil

Soundtrack 
Soundtrack was composed by Ilaiyaraaja. Lyrics were written by Vairamuthu and Gangai Amaran. A section of "Oru Kili Uruguthu" was incorporated into the official trailer for The Lovebirds (2020). The song also features in Miracle, a segment of the anthology film Putham Pudhu Kaalai (2020). The same song was reused by Ilaiyaraaja as "Jilibili" for the Telugu film Sitaara (1984).

References

External links 
 

1980s Tamil-language films
1983 films
Films directed by Gokula Krishnan
Films scored by Ilaiyaraaja